Cindy Eckert is an American entrepreneur known for founding Sprout Pharmaceuticals. She subsequently founded The Pink Ceiling which invests in companies founded by, or delivering products for, women. In November 2017, Eckert re-acquired Sprout Pharmaceuticals as part of a lawsuit settlement, and the rights to its drug Addyi, from Valeant after Valeant's stock collapsed due to insider trading and price jacking allegations.

Early life and education 
Cindy Eckert was born in Western New York. According to a New York Times profile piece, she attended a different school each year from the fourth grade through the twelfth. During those years she lived overseas where her father, Fred J. Eckert, served as a U.S. Ambassador to Fiji. She earned a Bachelor of Business Administration from Marymount University.

Career 
Eckert began her career with Merck, before moving on to work with smaller, specialty pharmaceutical companies Dura and Elan. After a stint with QVC, Eckert found Slate Pharmaceuticals and Sprout Pharmaceuticals.

She sold Sprout to Valeant in 2015 after the company won FDA approval for the drug Addyi, the first drug designed to enhance female libido. Prior to founding Sprout, Eckert co-founded Slate Pharmaceuticals in 2007. Slate was focused on men's sexual health with an FDA approved long acting testosterone product, Testopel. Slate sold in 2011 to Actient Pharmaceuticals.

Eckert established an investment firm called The Pink Ceiling in 2016 after the most recent exit, when she sold Sprout Pharmaceuticals to Valeant Pharmaceuticals for $1 billion. In November 2017, Eckert re-acquired Sprout Pharmaceuticals from Valeant for "almost nothing" as part of a settlement of a lawsuit, according to Bloomberg News. Valeant's stock had collapsed nearly 80% from the acquisition price due to a large financial engineering and price jacking scandal. 

In 2018, Eckert formally changed her name from Cindy Whitehead.

The Pink Ceiling 
Eckert launched the Pink Ceiling in order to improve access to capital for female-led start-ups. “The injustice I’m fighting with the Pink Ceiling is not only women’s limited access to capital, but also their limited access to mentors,” she told Entrepreneur Magazine. Eckert works with a team of women to determine which female-led companies will be the recipients of venture capital funding.

To date, The Pink Ceiling has invested in eleven start-ups, with public announcements on their involvement with Undercover Colors (a company that is developing wearable nail tech to detect the presence of a date rape drug in drinks), Lia Diagnostics (which produces a flushable pregnancy test), Intuitap (which has a medical device aimed to streamline the spinal tap procedure), and Pursuit (which is developing a patented technology to improve four different aspects of sleep)

The Pink Ceiling's affiliated incubator, called the “Pinkubator” because of its female focus, is located in Raleigh, North Carolina. The “Pinkubator” was established to provide female-focused entrepreneurs with direct access to mentors, investment opportunities, and business development guidance.

Controversy 
Eckert's drug Addyi has faced rampant criticism from scientists and physicians due to lack of efficacy and a PR campaign waged by her company Sprout Pharmaceuticals against the FDA. Critics have said that it shows the FDA caving to social pressure over the actual benefits of the drug. As of 2018 only about 600 prescriptions are filled every month according to Bloomberg. In 2020 the FDA sent Sprout a warning letter regarding their marketing of the drug demanding the Sprout create "comprehensive plan for truthful, non-misleading, and complete corrective messages".

References 

American women company founders
American company founders
American investors
Marymount University alumni
Year of birth missing (living people)
Living people
Businesspeople from New York (state)
21st-century American businesspeople
21st-century American businesswomen